

Acts of the National Assembly for Wales

|-
| {{|Well-being of Future Generations (Wales) Act 2015|cyshort=Deddf Llesiant Cenedlaethau'r Dyfodol (Cymru) 2015|anaw|2|29-04-2015|maintained=y|url=deddf-llesiant-cenedlaethaur-dyfodol-cymru-well-being-of-future-generations-wales-act|An Act of the National Assembly for Wales to make provision requiring public bodies to do things in pursuit of the economic, social, environmental and cultural well-being of Wales in a way that accords with the sustainable development principle; to require public bodies to report on such action; to establish a Commissioner for Future Generations to advise and assist public bodies in doing things in accordance with this Act; to establish public services boards in local authority areas; to make provision requiring those boards to plan and take action in pursuit of economic, social, environmental and cultural well-being in their area; and for connected purposes.|cylong=Deddf gan Gynulliad Cenedlaethol Cymru i wneud darpariaeth sy'n ei gwneud yn ofynnol i gyrff cyhoeddus wneud pethau er mwyn ymgyrraedd at lesiant economaidd, cymdeithasol, amgylcheddol a diwylliannol Cymru mewn modd sy'n gydnaws â'r egwyddor datblygu cynaliadwy; i'w gwneud yn ofynnol i gyrff cyhoeddus adrodd ar weithredoedd o'r fath; i sefydlu Comisiynydd Cenedlaethau'r Dyfodol i gynghori a chynorthwyo cyrff cyhoeddus wrth iddynt wneud pethau yn unol â'r Ddeddf hon; i sefydlu byrddau gwasanaethau cyhoeddus mewn ardaloedd awdurdodau lleol; i wneud darpariaeth sy'n ei gwneud yn ofynnol i'r byrddau hynny gynllunio a gweithredu i ymgyrraedd at lesiant economaidd, cymdeithasol, amgylcheddol a diwylliannol yn eu hardaloedd; ac at ddibenion cysylltiedig.}}
|-
| {{|Violence against Women, Domestic Abuse and Sexual Violence (Wales) Act 2015|cyshort=Deddf Trais yn erbyn Menywod, Cam-drin Domestig a Thrais Rhywiol (Cymru) 2015|anaw|3|29-04-2015|maintained=y|url=deddf-trais-yn-erbyn-menywod-cam-drin-domestig-thrais-rhywiol-cymru-2015-violence-against-women-domestic-abuse-and-sexual-violence-wales-act|An Act of the National Assembly for Wales to improve arrangements for the prevention of gender-based violence, domestic abuse and sexual violence; to improve arrangements for the protection of victims of such abuse and violence; to improve support for people affected by such abuse and violence; and to require the appointment of a National Adviser on gender-based violence, domestic abuse and sexual violence.|cylong=Deddf gan Gynulliad Cenedlaethol Cymru i wella trefniadau ar gyfer atal trais ar sail rhywedd, cam-drin domestig a thrais rhywiol; i wella trefniadau ar gyfer amddiffyn dioddefwyr cam-drin a thrais o'r fath; i wella'r cymorth sydd ar gael i bobl yr effeithir arnynt gan gamdriniaeth a thrais o'r fath; ac i'w gwneud yn ofynnol penodi Cynghorydd Cenedlaethol ar drais ar sail rhywedd, cam-drin domestig a thrais rhywiol.}}
|-
| {{|Planning (Wales) Act 2015|cyshort=Deddf Cynllunio (Cymru) 2015|anaw|4|06-07-2015|maintained=y|url=deddf-cynllunio-cymru-2015-planning-wales-act-2015|An Act of the National Assembly for Wales to make provision about national, strategic and local development planning in Wales; to make provision for certain applications for planning permission and certain other applications to be made to the Welsh Ministers; to make other provision about development management and applications for planning permission; to make provision about planning enforcement, appeals and certain other proceedings; to amend the Commons Act 2006; and for connected purposes.|cylong=Deddf gan Gynulliad Cenedlaethol Cymru i wneud darpariaeth ynghylch cynllunio datblygu cenedlaethol, strategol a lleol yng Nghymru; i wneud darpariaeth i geisiadau penodol am ganiatâd cynllunio a cheisiadau penodol eraill gael eu gwneud i Weinidogion Cymru; i wneud darpariaethau eraill ynghylch rheoli datblygu a cheisiadau am ganiatâd cynllunio; i wneud darpariaeth ynghylch gorfodi, apelau a gweithdrefnau penodol eraill ym maes cynllunio; i ddiwygio Deddf Tiroedd Comin 2006; ac at ddibenion cysylltiedig.}}
|-
| {{|Qualifications Wales Act 2015|cyshort=Deddf Cymwysterau Cymru 2015|anaw|5|05-08-2015|maintained=y|url=deddf-cymwysterau-cymru-2015-qualifications-wales-act-2015|An Act of the National Assembly for Wales to establish a new body to be known as Qualifications Wales; providing for Qualifications Wales to be able to recognise bodies responsible for awarding certain qualifications in Wales and to approve certain qualifications awarded in Wales and to perform certain other functions; and for connected purposes.|cylong=Deddf Cynulliad Cenedlaethol Cymru i sefydlu corff newydd o'r enw Cymwysterau Cymru; i ddarparu i Gymwysterau Cymru allu cydnabod cyrff sy'n gyfrifol am ddyfarnu cymwysterau penodol yng Nghymru a chymeradwyo cymwysterau penodol a ddyfernir yng Nghymru a chyflawni swyddogaethau penodol eraill; ac at ddibenion cysylltiedig.}}
|-
| {{|Local Government (Wales) Act 2015|cyshort=Deddf Llywodraeth Leol (Cymru) 2015|anaw|6|25-11-2015|maintained=y|url=deddf-llywodraeth-leol-cymru-2015-local-government-wales-act-2016|An Act of the National Assembly for Wales to make provision for and in connection with a reduction in the number of principal local authorities in Wales and to make other amendments of local government law as it applies in relation to Wales.|cylong=Deddf gan Gynulliad Cenedlaethol Cymru i wneud darpariaeth ar gyfer lleihau nifer y prif awdurdodau lleol yng Nghymru, ac mewn cysylltiad â hynny, ac i wneud diwygiadau eraill i gyfraith llywodraeth leol fel y mae'n gymwys mewn perthynas â Chymru.}}
}}

References

2015